Cristipocregyes rondoni is a species of beetle in the family Cerambycidae, and the only species in the genus Cristipocregyes. It was described by Stephan von Breuning in 1965.

References

Mesosini
Beetles described in 1965